Joughin Glacier is a glacier east of the Watson Peaks, flowing southeast into Wright Inlet on the Lassiter Coast. Named by the Advisory Committee on Antarctic Names in 2008 after Ian Joughin, an electrical engineer who pioneered the use of interferometric synthetic aperture radar to estimate surface motion and topography of ice sheets both in Antarctica and Greenland.  He has used remote sensing, field  work, and modeling to study ice dynamics since the early 1990s.

References

Glaciers of Palmer Land